G. V. Kumar is a Tamil film screenwriter, actor, and director based in Kodambakkam, Chennai who mainly works in Tamil cinema.

Kumar started his career as an assistant director and screenwriter. He wrote screenplay for Narasimha (2001 film), starring Vijayakanth. He then directed his debut film Puli Varudhu, starring Jithan Ramesh which was average at the box office. He has many feature film stories with screenplay writing in possession. Some of them are copyrighted for his next projects. He also participates in film discussions, actively works as assistant and co-director in many Tamil films. He also appears on-screen in multiple Tamil films and Tamil Serials, some of them notably as a Judge in Draupathi (2020 film) in second half, right hand of the villain Ashutosh Rana in the movie Motta Shiva Ketta Shiva. Currently he is pursuing to direct and produce a Crowdfunding film called Anthapurathin 7 Kathaigal.

References

Tamil film directors
Living people
Tamil screenwriters
1964 births
Film directors from Chennai